Adicto may refer to:

 "Adicto" (Prince Royce song), 2018
 "Adicto" (Tainy, Anuel AA and Ozuna song), 2019
 "Adicto", the Spanish version of the Enrique Iglesias song "Addicted"

See also
 Addicted (disambiguation)